Ilčo Naumoski (born 29 July 1983 in Prilep) is a Macedonian football player currently playing as a striker for FK Vardar in Macedonia. He has spent the majority of his career in Austria, having played with Grazer AK from 2002-2004 and for Mattersburg from 2005 until 2013.

Club career

Inter Baku
In August 2013, Naumoski signed a one-year contract with Inter Baku of the Azerbaijan Premier League, with the option of a second year. After only 4 appearances for the club and no goals, Naumoski's contract was terminated.

International career
He made his senior debut for Macedonia in a February 2003 friendly match against Croatia and has earned a total of 46 caps, scoring 9 goals. His final international was a February 2012 friendly against Luxembourg.

He scored one of his nine goals for Macedonia against Scotland.

International goals

References

External links
 
Ilco Naumoski profile  at svm.at 

Profile at MacedonianFootball.com 

1983 births
Living people
Sportspeople from Prilep
Association football forwards
Macedonian footballers
North Macedonia international footballers
SV Stockerau players
Grazer AK players
Catania S.S.D. players
Malatyaspor footballers
SV Mattersburg players
Shamakhi FK players
FK Vardar players
Austrian Regionalliga players
Austrian Football Bundesliga players
Süper Lig players
Azerbaijan Premier League players
Macedonian First Football League players
Macedonian expatriate footballers
Expatriate footballers in Austria
Macedonian expatriate sportspeople in Austria
Expatriate footballers in Turkey
Macedonian expatriate sportspeople in Turkey
Expatriate footballers in Italy
Macedonian expatriate sportspeople in Italy
Expatriate footballers in Azerbaijan
Macedonian expatriate sportspeople in Azerbaijan